In abstract algebra, especially in the area of group theory, a strong generating set of a permutation group is a generating set that clearly exhibits the permutation structure as described by a stabilizer chain.  A stabilizer chain is a sequence of subgroups, each containing the next and each stabilizing one more point.

Let  be a group of permutations of the set   Let 

 

Define 

A strong generating set (SGS) for G relative to the base  is a set 

 

such that 

 

for each  such that .

The base and the SGS are said to be non-redundant if 

 

A base and strong generating set (BSGS) for a group can be computed using the Schreier–Sims algorithm.

References
 A. Seress, Permutation Group Algorithms,  Cambridge University Press, 2002.

Computational group theory
Permutation groups